The 1987 Milan–San Remo was the 78th edition of the Milan–San Remo cycle race and was held on 21 March 1987.

References

1987
March 1987 sports events in Europe
1987 in road cycling
1987 in Italian sport
1987 Super Prestige Pernod International